is a Japanese light novel series written by Light Tuchihi and illustrated by Saori Toyota. It began serialization online in June 2016 on the Kadokawa's novel publishing website Kakuyomu. It was then acquired by Fujimi Shobo, who published the first light novel volume in February 2017 under their Kadokawa Books imprint. Seven volumes have been released as of December 2019. The light novel series is licensed in North America by Yen Press. A manga adaptation with art by Koyuki was serialized in Fujimi Shobo's shōnen manga magazine Monthly Dragon Age from November 2018 to October 2022. It has been collected in six tankōbon volumes. An anime television series adaptation by White Fox aired from October to December 2019.

Plot
Ristarte is a novice goddess who is placed in charge of saving the world of Gaeabrande from a Demon Lord by summoning a human hero. An S-class world, Gaeabrande is extremely dangerous, so Ristarte is careful to select a hero who will be able to prevail against the enemies. She settles on Seiya Ryuuguuin, whose stats are many times greater than any other contender. Unfortunately, upon summoning him, Ristarte finds to her dismay that he is ridiculously cautious of everything, including her. Refusing to even enter Gaeabrande's safest areas until he has trained to a level that he is comfortable with, Seiya's reticence drives the goddess crazy. However, when the pair finally do set foot on Gaeabrande, events may prove this hero's caution is well justified.

Characters

 (Japanese); Anthony Bowling (English) 
An overpowered hero who excels at everything, except for one minor problem – he is too cautious.

 (Japanese); Jamie Marchi (English)
The Goddess of Healing who is tasked with choosing a hero to save Gaeabrande, to which end she summons Seiya. Upon first meeting Seiya, she is immediately infatuated with him due to his perfect physique and complexion.

A young dragonkin warrior who ends up being Seiya's apprentice and one of his baggage carriers.

A young dragonkin mage who is Mash's childhood friend. Like Mash, she ends up being one of Seiya's baggage carriers. Starting off as a magic caster, she learns and focuses more on support type abilities.

Ristarte's senior goddess, and her go-to goddess if Seiya needed someone to train him. The Goddess of Sealing, she has saved numerous worlds.

A brawny god who wields a sword. He is known as the Divine Blade. Seiya ran him to the ground during training, even to the point of hiding from him.

The Great Goddess who serves as the leader of the other gods.

The Goddess of Destruction. Despite resistance, she goes on to train Seiya with a few restrictions.

The Goddess of Fire.

The Goddess of War. She has a major crush on Seiya, going berserk and demented when he rejected her at first.

The Goddess of Archery. She is known for her nymphomania.

Media

Light novels
The series was first published online in Kadokawa's user-generated novel publishing website Kakuyomu in June 2016 by Light Tuchihi. Later on, publisher Fujimi Shobo acquired the title and published the first volume as a light novel under their Kadokawa Books imprint in February 2017. The series is licensed in North America by Yen Press.

Manga
A manga adaptation by Koyuki was serialized in Fujimi Shobo's Monthly Dragon Age from November 9, 2018, to October 7, 2022. The manga is also licensed in North America by Yen Press.

Anime

An anime television series adaptation by White Fox was announced on November 7, 2018. The series was directed by Masayuki Sakoi, with Kenta Ihara handling series composition, Mai Toda designing the characters, and Yoshiaki Fujisawa composing the music. It aired from October 2 to December 27, 2019 on AT-X and other channels. Myth & Roid performed the series' opening theme song "TIT FOR TAT", while Riko Azuna performed the series' ending theme song "be perfect, plz!". Funimation had licensed the series for a SimulDub. Following Sony's acquisition of Crunchyroll, the series was moved to Crunchyroll. The third episode, which was supposed to air on October 16, 2019, was delayed by a week due to production issues, with a re-broadcast of Episode 2 taking its place. Similarly, Episode 10 was delayed for a week due to production issues, with a recap episode taking its place. Characters from the series have also appeared in the crossover anime series Isekai Quartet.

Reception
Gadget Tsūshin listed Seiya's catchphrase in their 2019 anime buzzwords list.

See also
 Full Dive, another light novel series by the same author

Notes

References

External links
  at Kakuyomu 
  
  
 

2019 anime television series debuts
2017 Japanese novels
Anime and manga based on light novels
AT-X (TV network) original programming
Book series introduced in 2016
Comedy anime and manga
Crunchyroll anime
Fiction about reincarnation
Fujimi Shobo
Fujimi Shobo manga
Isekai anime and manga
Isekai novels and light novels
Kadokawa Dwango franchises
Light novels
Light novels first published online
Muse Communication
Shōnen manga
Television shows based on light novels
White Fox
Yen Press titles